Sailendra Nath Roy (1964–2013) was an Indian man who registered his name in the Guinness Book of World Records for the farthest distance travelled on a zip wire using hair. He achieved the record at Neemrana Fort Palace, Neemrana, Rajasthan, India, on 1 March 2011. Sailendra zip lined the entire 82.5 m attached to the zip wire only by his hair, which he tied in a looped ponytail. Again in September 2012, he pulled a Darjeeling Himalayan Railway locomotive with his ponytail in north Bengal for 2.5 metres (8.2 feet) in the town of Siliguri, West Bengal.

Death
Roy died on 28 April 2013, while trying to beat his own record of farthest distance travelled on a zip wire using hair. Roy died due to a heart attack during his record try at Teesta River. His ponytail became stuck in the wheeler of the rope halfway through the stunt and he was left hanging in midair for about 25 minutes. He was 49 years old.

References

2013 deaths
Indian stunt performers
People from Siliguri
1964 births